The Natal long-fingered bat (Miniopterus natalensis) is a species of vesper bat in the family Miniopteridae. It can be found in Angola, Botswana, Democratic Republic of the Congo, possibly Eswatini, Ethiopia, Kenya, Lesotho, Malawi, Mozambique, Namibia, South Africa, South Sudan, Tanzania, Uganda, Zambia, and Zimbabwe. It is found in dry savanna, moist savanna, Mediterranean-type shrubby vegetation, caves, and hot deserts.

While Natal long-fingered bats normally prey on insects, they can sometimes prey on fish. For this, the long-fingered bats have been able to use their primary ability to react to a disappearing target in order to catch moving fish by reaching deeper in the water when a fish dives.

Gallery

References

Miniopteridae
Taxa named by Andrew Smith (zoologist)
Bats of Africa
Mammals described in 1834
Taxonomy articles created by Polbot